Ride is the debut studio album by American country music artist Shelly Fairchild, released in March 2005 (see 2005 in country music) on Columbia Records. It includes the singles "You Don't Lie Here Anymore", "Tiny Town" and "Kiss Me". Although "You Don't Lie Here Anymore" reached #35 on the U.S. country singles charts in late 2004, the other two singles failed to chart.

Critical reception
Stephen Thomas Erlewine of Allmusic gave the album four-and-a-half stars out of five, saying that it was "well-crafted, built upon a strong set of songs, and it pulls off the nifty trick of being classic Nashville product yet fresh and vibrant, due to Fairchild's consistently engaging performances." Entertainment Weekly critic Chris Willman rated it B+, describing the album's sound as "skirting the virtually bygone line between country and Southern rock" and commending Fairchild's vocal performance on "Kiss Me." Jeffrey B. Remz of Country Standard Time also praised Fairchild's vocals, but criticized the production of some tracks for being "too polished."

Track listing

Personnel
As listed in liner notes.
David Angell - violin
Pat Buchanan - harmonica
Tom Bukovac - electric guitar
Ashley Cleveland - background vocals
J. T. Corenflos - electric guitar
Eric Darken - percussion
David Davidson - violin
Chip Davis - background vocals
Dan Dugmore - acoustic guitar, pedal steel guitar, lap steel guitar, Dobro
Stuart Duncan - fiddle, mandolin
Chris Dunn - trombone
Kenny Greenberg - electric guitar, resonator guitar
Tim Hensley - banjo
Steven Herrman - trumpet
Wes Hightower - background vocals
Jim Horn - baritone saxophone, tenor saxophone
Rob Ickes - Dobro
Anthony LaMarchina - cello
Liana Manis - background vocals
Chris McHugh - drums, percussion
Steve Nathan - piano, Hammond organ, Wurlitzer
Larry Paxton - bass guitar
Mickey Raphael - harmonica
John Wesley Ryles - background vocals
Darrell Scott - acoustic guitar, baritone guitar
Stephony Smith - background vocals
Dan Tyminski - acoustic guitar, mandolin, background vocals
Kristin Wilkinson - viola, string arrangements
John Willis - acoustic guitar, banjo
Curtis Wright - background vocals

Chart performance

References

2005 debut albums
Albums produced by Buddy Cannon
Columbia Records albums
Shelly Fairchild albums
Albums produced by Kenny Greenberg